The  was a "last-ditch" hand grenade developed by the Imperial Japanese Navy in the closing stages of World War II.

History and development
By late 1944 and early 1945, much of the industrial infrastructure of Japan had been destroyed by Allied strategic bombing, and there was a growing shortage of raw materials due to Allied naval blockades and submarine warfare. Lacking in metals to mass-produce hand grenades in the vast quantities that would be needed against the projected Allied invasion of Japan, the Imperial Japanese Navy Technical Bureau developed a design for a cheap, easy-to-make grenade made of ceramic or porcelain materials. Kilns famous for the production of traditional Japanese pottery, such as Arita, Bizen and Seto were pressed into service to manufacture these relatively crude weapons. There were a tremendous number of variants on shape, size and color, because the design depended on each kiln.

Design
The Type 4 grenade had a fragmentation body made of terra cotta or porcelain materials. The grenade was round-shaped with a bottle neck with a rubber cover and a simple fuse. This detonator was no more than a blasting cap crimped on to a five-second length of fuse. The other end of the fuse, which was outside the rubber plug, was covered with a match-head composition. A slip-on rubber cap covered the whole neck, and fuse. A small, loose wooden block with an abrasive composition on one side was contained in the rubber fuse cover.

Combat record 
Type 4 grenades were passed out in large quantities to civil defense organizations, such as the Volunteer Fighting Corps, Yokusan Sonendan, and to reservist organizations involved in preparations against the possible invasion of the Japanese home islands by Allied forces. They were also supplied to front line combat troops in large quantities, and are known to have been employed at the Battle of Iwo Jima and Battle of Okinawa.

Photo gallery

Notes

References

External links
Ceramic Grenades
Details of internal construction

World War II infantry weapons of Japan
44
Fragmentation grenades
Hand grenades of Japan
Weapons and ammunition introduced in 1944